The 36th Chess Olympiad, organized by the Fédération Internationale des Échecs (FIDE) and comprising an open and a women's tournament, as well as several events designed to promote the game of chess, took place between October 14 and October 31, 2004, in Calvià on the Spanish island of Mallorca. There were 129 teams in the open event and 87 in the women's event. In total, 1204 players were registered (some of whom did not play, though).

Both tournament sections were officiated by international arbiter Ignatius Leong (Singapore). Teams were paired across the 14 rounds of competition according to the Swiss system. The open division was played over four boards per round, whilst the women's was played over three. In the event of a draw, the tie-break was decided by 1. The Buchholz system; 2. Match points; 3. The Sonneborn-Berger system; and 4. The Median Buchholz system.

The time control for each game permitted each player 90 minutes for all their moves, with an additional 30 seconds increment for each player after each move, beginning with the first.

Open event

The open division was contested by 129 teams representing 125 nations. Spain, as hosts, fielded three teams, whilst the International Braille Chess Association (IBCA) and the International Physically Disabled Chess Association (IPCA) each provided one squad.

Led by first board Vasyl Ivanchuk, the seventh highest-rated player at the tournament, who recorded 9½ points over 13 rounds, and second reserve Sergey Karjakin who, aged just 14 years, won 6 of his 7 games (surrendering a draw only to American Gregory Kaidanov), Ukraine scored all four possible points in each of their first three matches before "only" defeating Russia 2½-1½ in the fourth round, eventually accumulating a nearly insurmountable three-point lead after the penultimate round. The Ukrainian team nevertheless scored three points against France and claimed their first title, three points ahead of Russia, who had entered the tournament as the top seed, having brought four of the tournament's nine highest-rated players, and as defending six-time champions.

Armenia, one of just four teams to draw a match with Ukraine, paced by second board Levon Aronian, who did not lose in 12 games, and third board Rafael Vaganian, who scored 8½ points in 11 games, lost 1½-2½ to Russia in the eighth round. Ultimately, on the strength of a 3½-½ final round defeat of Georgia, they tied Russia's 36½ points. Armenia were placed after Russia, though, on the Buchholz tie-breaker system employed by the Olympiad, and finished, as in the previous Olympiad, with the bronze medals. Hosts Spain, led by Alexei Shirov, just managed to squeeze into the top ten.

Notable absentees from the tournament were the no. 1 player in the world, Garry Kasparov, as well as classical World Champion Vladimir Kramnik and his challenger Peter Leko, who were just finishing their championship match (Kramnik retained his title with a 7–7 tie). FIDE Champion Rustam Kasimdzhanov was present, however, and led Uzbekistan to 14th place by going undefeated in his 8 games (+4-0=4).

{| class="wikitable"
|+ Open event
! # !! Country !! Players !! Averagerating !! Points !! Buchholz
|-
| style="background:gold;"|1 ||  || Ivanchuk, Ponomariov, Volokitin, Moiseenko, Eljanov, Karjakin || 2680 || 39½ || 
|-
| style="background:silver;"|2 ||  || Morozevich, Svidler, Grischuk, Dreev, Khalifman, Zvjaginsev || 2718 || 36½ || 460.0
|-
| style="background:#cc9966;"|3 ||  || Akopian, Aronian, Vaganian, Lputian, Sargissian, Minasian || 2660 || 36½ || 459.0
|-
| 4 ||  || Onischuk, Shabalov, Goldin, Kaidanov, Novikov, Gulko || 2623 || 35 || 
|-
| 5 ||  || Gelfand, Sutovsky, Smirin, Avrukh, Huzman, Roiz || 2670 || 34½ || 
|-
| 6 ||  || Viswanathan Anand, Krishnan Sasikiran, Pendyala Harikrishna,Surya Shekhar Ganguly, Abhijit Kunte, Chanda Sandipan || 2655 || 34 || 
|-
| 7 ||  || Domínguez, Bruzón, Delgado, Nogueiras, Arencibia, Quezada || 2596 || 33½ || 
|-
| 8 ||  || Van Wely, Sokolov, Tiviakov, Timman, Van den Doel, Nijboer || 2641 || 33 || 
|-
| 9 ||  || Georgiev, Delchev, Cheparinov, Spasov, Chatalbashev, Radulski || 2584 || 32½ || 453.0
|-
| 10 ||  || Shirov, Vallejo Pons, Illescas Córdoba, Cifuentes Parada, Romero Holmes, Arizmendi Martínez || 2643 || 32½ || 439.5
|}
{| class="wikitable collapsible collapsed"
! # !! Country !! Averagerating !! Points !! Buchholz !! MP
|-
| 11 ||  || 2569 || 32½ || 427.5 || 
|-
| 12 ||  || 2624 || 32 || 445.5 || 
|-
| 13 ||  || 2559 || 32 || 442.5 || 
|-
| 14 ||  || 2550 || 32 || 440.5 || 
|-
| 15 ||  || 2568 || 32 || 435.0 || 
|-
| 16 ||  || 2617 || 32 || 430.0 || 
|-
| 17 ||  || 2575 || 32 || 427.5 || 
|-
| 18 ||  || 2609 || 32 || 424.0 || 
|-
| 19 ||  || 2502 || 32 || 422.5 || 
|-
| 20 ||  || 2590 || 32 || 417.5 || 
|-
| 21 ||  || 2621 || 31½ || 462.0 || 
|-
| 22 ||  || 2615 || 31½ || 450.5 || 
|-
| 23 ||  || 2621 || 31½ || 449.0 || 
|-
| 24 ||  || 2612 || 31½ || 438.5 || 
|-
| 25 ||  || 2532 || 31½ || 428.0 || 
|-
| 26 ||  || 2483 || 31½ || 425.0 || 
|-
| 27 ||  || 2542 || 31½ || 420.0 || 
|-
| 28 ||  || 2563 || 31½ || 419.5 || 
|-
| 29 ||  || 2589 || 31 || 445.0 || 
|-
| 30 ||  || 2653 || 31 || 427.0 || 
|-
| 31 ||  || 2614 || 31 || 425.5 || 
|-
| 32 ||  || 2544 || 31 || 423.5 || 17
|-
| 33 ||  || 2539 || 31 || 423.5 || 15
|-
| 34 ||  || 2544 || 31 || 419.5 || 
|-
| 35 ||  || 2488 || 31 || 418.5 || 
|-
| 36 ||  || 2589 || 30½ || 432.5 || 
|-
| 37 ||  || 2545 || 30½ || 431.0 || 
|-
| 38 ||  || 2494 || 30½ || 426.0 || 
|-
| 39 ||  || 2549 || 30½ || 419.5 || 
|-
| 40 ||  || 2486 || 30½ || 407.5 || 
|-
| 41 ||  || 2485 || 30½ || 396.5 || 
|-
| 42 ||  || 2521 || 30 || 419.0 || 
|-
| 43 ||  || 2454 || 30 || 403.0 || 
|-
| 44 ||  "B" || 2494 || 29½ || 424.0 || 
|-
| 45 ||  || 2569 || 29½ || 422.0 || 
|-
| 46 ||  || 2562 || 29½ || 415.5 || 
|-
| 47 ||  || 2496 || 29½ || 413.5 || 
|-
| 48 ||  || 2397 || 29½ || 408.0 || 
|-
| 49 ||  || 2456 || 29½ || 406.5 || 
|-
| 50 ||  || 2365 || 29½ || 404.0 || 
|-
| 51 ||  || 2515 || 29 || 416.5 || 
|-
| 52 ||  || 2497 || 29 || 411.5 || 
|-
| 53 ||  || 2460 || 29 || 405.0 || 
|-
| 54 ||  || 2473 || 29 || 403.0 || 
|-
| 55 ||  || 2387 || 29 || 395.0 || 16
|-
| 56 ||  || 2427 || 29 || 395.0 || 13
|-
| 57 || IPCA || 2348 || 29 || 394.5 || 
|-
| 58 ||  || 2444 || 28½ || 406.5 || 
|-
| 59 ||  || 2481 || 28½ || 406.0 || 
|-
| 60 ||  || 2476 || 28½ || 400.5 || 14
|-
| 61 ||  || 2303 || 28½ || 400.5 || 12
|-
| 62 ||  || 2444 || 28½ || 396.5 || 
|-
| 63 ||  || 2354 || 28½ || 387.0 || 14
|-
| 64 ||  || 2431 || 28½ || 387.0 || 13
|-
| 65 ||  || 2332 || 28½ || 383.5 || 
|-
| 66 ||  || 2410 || 28½ || 355.0 || 
|-
| 67 ||  || 2437 || 28 || 403.5 || 
|-
| 68 ||  || 2400 || 28 || 393.0 || 
|-
| 69 ||  || 2298 || 28 || 381.5 || 
|-
| 70 ||  || 2241 || 28 || 370.0 || 
|-
| 71 ||  || 2381 || 27½ || 402.0 || 
|-
| 72 ||  || 2424 || 27½ || 401.0 || 
|-
| 73 ||  || 2341 || 27½ || 397.0 || 
|-
| 74 ||  || 2410 || 27½ || 385.5 || 
|-
| 75 ||  || 2281 || 27½ || 377.0 || 
|-
| 76 ||  || 2342 || 27½ || 356.0 || 
|-
| 77 ||  || 2354 || 27 || 398.0 || 
|-
| 78 ||  || 2305 || 27 || 390.0 || 
|-
| 79 ||  || 2399 || 27 || 386.0 || 
|-
| 80 ||  || 2363 || 27 || 384.5 || 
|-
| 81 ||  "C" || 2334 || 27 || 383.5 || 
|-
| 82 ||  || 2325 || 27 || 381.5 || 
|-
| 83 ||  || 2276 || 27 || 369.5 || 
|-
| 84 ||  || 2370 || 26½ || 397.5 || 
|-
| 85 ||  || 2316 || 26½ || 383.0 || 
|-
| 86 ||  || 2281 || 26½ || 375.5 || 
|-
| 87 ||  || 2252 || 26½ || 372.0 || 
|-
| 88 ||  || 2136 || 26½ || 351.0 || 
|-
| 89 ||  || 2289 || 26 || 382.5 || 
|-
| 90 ||  || 2337 || 26 || 379.0 || 
|-
| 91 ||  || 2188 || 26 || 368.5 || 
|-
| 92 ||  || 2264 || 26 || 367.5 || 
|-
| 93 ||  || 2226 || 26 || 365.0 || 
|-
| 94 ||  || 2212 || 26 || 358.0 || 
|-
| 95 ||  || 2174 || 25½ || 358.5 || 
|-
| 96 ||  || 1986 || 25½ || 340.5 || 
|-
| 97 || IBCA || 2358 || 25 || 370.5 || 
|-
| 98 ||  || 2279 || 25 || 368.5 || 
|-
| 99 ||  || 2260 || 25 || 358.5 || 
|-
| 100 ||  || 2245 || 24½ || 376.5 || 
|-
| 101 ||  || 2141 || 24½ || 363.0 || 
|-
| 102 ||  || 2070 || 24½ || 362.5 || 
|-
| 103 ||  || 2184 || 24½ || 355.5 || 
|-
| 104 ||  || 2187 || 24½ || 350.0 || 
|-
| 105 ||  || 2137 || 24½ || 347.0 || 
|-
| 106 ||  || 2179 || 24½ || 301.0 || 
|-
| 107 ||  || 1906 || 24 || 352.5 || 
|-
| 108 ||  || 2186 || 24 || 336.0 || 
|-
| 109 ||  || 2202 || 23½ || 360.5 || 
|-
| 110 ||  || 2119 || 23½ || 348.5 || 
|-
| 111 ||  || 2207 || 23½ || 341.0 || 
|-
| 112 ||  || 2122 || 23½ || 301.0 || 
|-
| 113 ||  || 2157 || 23½ || 300.5 || 
|-
| 114 ||  || 2127 || 23½ || 299.0 || 
|-
| 115 ||  || 1866 || 23½ || 248.0 || 
|-
| 116 ||  || 2137 || 23 || 357.5 || 
|-
| 117 ||  || 2201 || 23 || 344.5 || 
|-
| 118 ||  || 1904 || 23 || 314.5 || 
|-
| 119 ||  || 2098 || 22 || 293.5 || 
|-
| 120 ||  || 2152 || 22 || 276.5 || 
|-
| 121 ||  || 2170 || 21½ || 313.5 || 
|-
| 122 ||  || 2003 || 21½ || 282.5 || 
|-
| 123 ||  || 1812 || 21 ||  || 
|-
| 124 ||  || 1832 || 20½ ||  || 
|-
| 125 ||  || 1824 || 18½ 1 ||  || 
|-
| 126 ||  || 1750 || 17 ||  || 
|-
| 127 ||  || 1866 || 15½ 1 ||  || 
|-
| 128 ||  || 1600 || 13½ ||  || 
|-
| 129 ||  || 1766 || 11½ ||  || 
|}

1 Bermuda actually scored 22 and Papua New Guinea 23 points, but because some of their players refused to submit to doping tests, the points scored by those players were deducted from the final scores: 3½ points from Bermuda and 7½ from Papua New Guinea.

Group prizes

In addition to the overall medals, prizes were given out to the best teams in five different seeding groups—in other words, the teams who exceeded their seeding the most. Overall medal winners were not eligible for group prizes.

{| class="wikitable"
|+ Group Prizes
! Group !! Seedingrange !! Team !! Seed !! Overallfinish
|-
| A || 1–25 ||  || 10 || 4
|-
| B || 26–51 ||  || 29 || 13
|-
| C || 52–77 ||  || 54 || 43
|-
| D || 78–103 ||  || 83 || 61
|-
| E || 104–129 ||  || 112 || 87
|}

Individual medals

 Performance rating:  Baadur Jobava 2842
 Board 1:  Evgenij Ermenkov 10½ / 12 = 87.5%
 Board 2:  Mohamed Tissir 7½ / 9 = 83.3%
 Board 3:  Rafael Vaganian 9½ / 12 = 79.2%
 Board 4:  Baadur Jobava 8½ / 10 = 85.0%
 1st reserve:  Vaidas Sakalauskas 6 / 7 = 85.7%
 2nd reserve:  Sergey Karjakin and  Ibrahim Chahrani 6½ / 7 = 92.9%

Women's event

The women's division was contested by 87 teams representing 84 nations. Spain, as hosts, fielded two teams, whilst the International Braille Chess Association (IBCA) and the International Physically Disabled Chess Association (IPCA) each provided one squad.

China, led by first board Xie Jun (ex-World Champion) and second board Xu Yuhua (future champion), entered the competition as top seed and defending triple champions and quickly took the lead, conceding just two draws in their first five matches. They then defeated the silver and bronze medallists from the previous Olympiad, Russia and Poland (each 2–1), in the sixth and eighth rounds, respectively. Eventually they carried a six-point lead into a tenth round match with second placed United States.

Susan Polgar (another ex-World Champion), who entered the tournament as the second highest-rated player and achieved the best performance rating of all, drew Xie Jun, while Irina Krush won her second board game against Xu Yuhua. A draw by Anna Zatonskih against Zhao Xue gave the Americans a 2–1 win over the Chinese team.  In rounds eleven and twelve, China drew Hungary and lost to Georgia, whilst the US team defeated Slovakia and then scored a 2½-½ victory over Hungary, drawing within three points of China with two rounds remaining.  China, though, defeated sixth-seed India and 12th-seed Slovakia in the final two rounds, scoring four points to preserve what was ultimately a three-point win and to clinch the Vera Menchik Trophy for a fourth consecutive time.

Second-seed Russia were led by Nadezhda Kosintseva, who won top honours on the first reserve board for scoring 10 points in 12 rounds. The Russians were only in eighth place after ten rounds but had advanced to fourth place entering the penultimate round, where they faced Georgia, who they trailed by half a point. Although first board Maya Chiburdanidze (ex-World Champion) and second board Nana Dzagnidze, who both scored 8½ points for their team over the event, drew their matches, third board Lela Javakhishvili lost to Kosintseva, giving the Russian team a half-point lead over Georgia; although Georgia defeated Ukraine 2½-½ in the final round, Russia managed to secure two points against France, equalling Georgia's total and winning the bronze medals on tie-breaks.

Newly crowned World Champion Antoaneta Stefanova disappointed as captain of the Bulgarian team, scoring only 5½ points in 11 games. Bulgaria eventually finished in 14th place.

{| class="wikitable"
! # !! Country !! Players !! Averagerating !! Points !! Buchholz
|-
| style="background:gold;"|1 ||  || Xie Jun, Xu Yuhua, Zhao Xue, Huang Qian || 2514 || 31 || 
|-
| style="background:silver;"|2 ||  || Polgar, Krush, Zatonskih, Shahade || 2490 || 28 || 
|-
| style="background:#cc9966;"|3 ||  || Kosteniuk, T. Kosintseva, Kovalevskaya, N. Kosintseva || 2491 || 27½ || 346.0
|-
| 4 ||  || Chiburdanidze, Dzagnidze, Javakhishvili, Lomineishvili || 2470 || 27½ || 339.0
|-
| 5 ||  || Skripchenko, Marie Sebag, Silvia Collas, Sophie Milliet || 2417 || 25½ || 
|-
| 6 ||  || Mádl, Vajda, Gara, Lakos || 2376 || 25 || 348.5
|-
| 7 ||  || Repkova, Pokorná, Hagarova, Borošová || 2377 || 25 || 337.0
|-
| 8 ||  || Hunt, Houska, Richards, Buckley || 2293 || 25 || 334.5
|-
| 9 ||  || Humpy Koneru, Subbaraman Vijayalakshmi, Dronavalli Harika, Nisha Mohota || 2435 || 24½ || 352.0
|-
| 10 ||  || Radziewicz, Soćko, Dworakowska, Zielinska || 2428 || 24½ || 340.0
|}
{| class="wikitable collapsible collapsed"
! # !! Country !! Averagerating !! Points !! Buchholz !! MP
|-
| 11 ||  || 2374 || 24½ || 330.5 || 
|-
| 12 ||  || 2372 || 24½ || 317.5 || 
|-
| 13 ||  || 2311 || 24 || 329.5 || 
|-
| 14 ||  || 2410 || 24 || 329.0 || 
|-
| 15 ||  || 2301 || 24 || 327.0 || 
|-
| 16 ||  || 2406 || 24 || 324.5 || 
|-
| 17 ||  || 2365 || 24 || 323.5 || 
|-
| 18 ||  || 2456 || 23½ || 342.0 || 
|-
| 19 ||  || 2288 || 23½ || 325.5 || 
|-
| 20 ||  || 2408 || 23½ || 318.5 || 
|-
| 21 ||  || 2308 || 23½ || 317.0 || 
|-
| 22 ||  || 2317 || 23 || 325.0 || 
|-
| 23 ||  || 2294 || 23 || 323.0 || 
|-
| 24 ||  || 2303 || 23 || 321.0 || 
|-
| 25 ||  || 2247 || 23 || 320.5 || 
|-
| 26 ||  || 2296 || 23 || 313.5 || 
|-
| 27 ||  || 2278 || 23 || 308.0 || 
|-
| 28 ||  || 2308 || 22½ || 313.5 || 
|-
| 29 ||  || 2343 || 22½ || 311.5 || 
|-
| 30 ||  || 2274 || 22½ || 302.0 || 
|-
| 31 ||  || 2250 || 22½ || 298.0 || 
|-
| 32 ||  || 2235 || 22½ || 293.0 || 
|-
| 33 ||  || 2317 || 22 || 315.5 || 
|-
| 34 ||  || 2208 || 22 || 313.5 || 
|-
| 35 ||  || 2263 || 22 || 313.0 || 
|-
| 36 ||  || 2229 || 22 || 290.0 || 
|-
| 37 ||  || 2115 || 21½ || 303.0 || 
|-
| 38 ||  || 2149 || 21½ || 302.5 || 
|-
| 39 ||  || 2243 || 21½ || 299.5 || 
|-
| 40 ||  || 2084 || 21½ || 299.0 || 
|-
| 41 ||  || 2123 || 21½ || 277.0 || 
|-
| 42 ||  || 2144 || 21 || 299.0 || 
|-
| 43 ||  || 2242 || 21 || 297.0 || 
|-
| 44 ||  "B" || 2187 || 21 || 296.5 || 
|-
| 45 ||  || 2146 || 21 || 293.0 || 
|-
| 46 ||  || 2213 || 21 || 292.0 || 
|-
| 47 ||  || 2243 || 20½ || 306.0 || 
|-
| 48 ||  || 1940 || 20½ || 295.0 || 
|-
| 49 ||  || 2124 || 20½ || 292.0 || 
|-
| 50 ||  || 2147 || 20½ || 288.5 || 
|-
| 51 ||  || 2148 || 20½ || 288.0 || 
|-
| 52 ||  || 1975 || 20½ || 285.0 || 
|-
| 53 ||  || 2082 || 20½ || 283.5 || 
|-
| 54 ||  || 2072 || 20½ || 282.5 || 
|-
| 55 ||  || 2122 || 20 || 292.0 || 
|-
| 56 ||  || 2002 || 20 || 288.5 || 
|-
| 57 ||  || 2134 || 20 || 281.5 || 
|-
| 58 ||  || 1760 || 20 || 279.0 || 
|-
| 59 ||  || 1775 || 20 || 277.5 || 
|-
| 60 ||  || 1748 || 20 || 276.0 || 
|-
| 61 ||  || 2138 || 20 || 274.5 || 
|-
| 62 ||  || 1749 || 20 || 265.0 || 
|-
| 63 ||  || 2224 || 19½ || 295.0 || 
|-
| 64 ||  || 2133 || 19½ || 289.0 || 
|-
| 65 ||  || 1942 || 19½ || 282.0 || 
|-
| 66 || IPCA || 2080 || 19½ || 270.0 || 
|-
| 67 ||  || 1704 || 19½ || 229.5 || 
|-
| 68 ||  || 1875 || 19 || 291.0 || 
|-
| 69 ||  || 2120 || 19 || 276.5 || 
|-
| 70 ||  || 1600 || 19 || 261.5 || 
|-
| 71 ||  || 1763 || 19 || 259.0 || 
|-
| 72 ||  || 1764 || 19 || 226.5 || 
|-
| 73 ||  || 1884 || 19 || 220.5 || 
|-
| 74 ||  || 1981 || 18½ || 292.5 || 
|-
| 75 || IBCA || 1875 || 18½ || 257.0 || 
|-
| 76 ||  || 1878 || 18½ || 231.5 || 
|-
| 77 ||  || 2023 || 18 || 275.5 || 
|-
| 78 ||  || 1899 || 18 || 242.0 || 
|-
| 79 ||  || 1600 || 18 || 233.0 || 
|-
| 80 ||  || 1891 || 17½ ||  || 
|-
| 81 ||  || 1600 || 16½ ||  || 
|-
| 82 ||  || 1695 || 13½ ||  || 
|-
| 83 ||  || 1716 || 12½ ||  || 
|-
| 84 ||  || 1600 || 12 || 209.0 || 
|-
| 85 ||  || 1600 || 12 || 206.5 || 
|-
| 86 ||  || 1600 || 11 ||  || 
|-
| 87 ||  || 1600 || 8 ||  || 
|}

Group prizes

In addition to the overall medals, prizes were given out to the best teams in five different seeding groups—in other words, the teams who exceeded their seeding the most. Overall medal winners were not eligible for group prizes.

{| class="wikitable"
|+ Group Prizes
! Group !! Seedingrange !! Team !! Seed !! Overallfinish
|-
| A || 1–17 ||  || 4 || 4
|-
| B || 18–34 ||  || 27 || 8
|-
| C || 35–51 ||  || 37 || 32
|-
| D || 52–69 ||  || 55 || 37
|-
| E || 70–87 ||  || 75 || 58
|}

Individual medals

 Performance rating:  Susan Polgar 2622
 Board 1:  Viktorija Čmilytė 8½ / 11 = 77.3%
 Board 2:  Szidonia Vajda and  Corina Peptan 9 / 12 = 75.0%
 Board 3:  Zhao Xue and  Irine Kharisma Sukandar 10 / 12 = 83.3%
 Reserve:  Nadezhda Kosintseva 10 / 12 = 83.3%

Overall title

The Nona Gaprindashvili Trophy is awarded to the nation that has the best average rank in the open and women's divisions. Where two or more teams are tied, they are ordered by best single finish in either division and then by total number of points scored.

The trophy, named after the former women's World Champion (1961–78), was created by FIDE in 1997.

Controversies

Azmaiparashvili incident

Prior to the closing ceremony of the Olympiad, FIDE vice president Zurab Azmaiparashvili attempted to ascend the stage in order to inform the presenter of the Nona Gaprindashvili Trophy that the latter ought more clearly to explain Gaprindashvili's contributions to the game of chess (Gaprindashvili had been World Champion for 17 years). Security officers, in conjunction with local police, did not permit Azmaiparashvili access to tournament organizers, and a struggle ensued after which Azmaiparashvili, having sustained several injuries, was arrested by the local law enforcement. He secured his release on bail for € 500 after having been held for 40 hours, and the charges against him were later dropped.

Azmaiparashvili and FIDE averred that Azmaiparashvili was detained and physically accosted despite he had properly and clearly [displayed] his VIP credentials, whilst representatives of the Spanish chess federation ("Federación Española de Ajedrez") and tournament organizers blamed Azmaiparashvili for the incident, saying that he without any previous provocation, assaulted [an] agent with a head butt to [the] mouth.

Drug testing

Having been formally recognized by the International Olympic Committee in 1999, in preparation for prospective inclusion in future iterations of the Olympic Games, FIDE implemented (in 2001) doping restrictions consistent with those adopted by the World Anti-Doping Agency (WADA). Two players, Shaun Press of Papua New Guinea and Bobby Miller of Bermuda, refused, for various reasons, to submit urine samples for analysis. Both players appeared before the FIDE Doping Hearing panel, which decided to cancel the players' performances (Press had scored 7½ points in 14 games, while Miller had scored 3½ points in 9 games), reducing the final score of Papua New Guinea to 15½ (from 23) and that of Bermuda to 18½ (from 22).

Associated events

Concomitant to the tournaments were several chess-related events planned by the organizing committee of the Olympiad, some under the auspices of FIDE; the events were known collectively as the First Chess Festival Calvià 2004. Within the festival were held simultaneous exhibitions, game demonstrations and lectures by top Spanish players, and several secondary tournaments, including one for amateur players, a rapid chess event for players aged under 16, and one for senior players.

Chess classes were introduced into the primary and secondary schools, as well as senior centers, in and around Calvià in an effort to promote chess generally, and chess films were screened on the beaches of Calvià every weeknight during the Olympiad. Chess-oriented art was displayed at an International Chess Fair, with prizes for top works awarded by a jury.

Footnotes

Notes

Sources

External links
 36th Chess Olympiad: Calvia 2004 OlimpBase
 Olympiad open division detailed results
 Olympiad women's division detailed results
 This Week in Chess Olympiad round-by-round summaries

Chess Olympiads
Women's Chess Olympiads
Chess in Spain
2004 in chess
2004 in Spanish sport
Calvià
Sport in Mallorca